Langberg s a surname. Notable people with the surname include:

 Ebbe Langberg (1933–1989), Danish actor and film director
 Jesper Langberg (1940–2019), Danish film actor
 Karl Adolf Langberg (1850–1889), Norwegian civil servant and politician.
 Sigurd Langberg (1897–1954), Danish stage and film actor

See also 
Langeberg (disambiguation), includes list of people named Langeberg